(Hanja:) is a popular type of gathering in the society of South Korea, and refers to a group of people getting together to eat and drink. In Korean society, Hoesik has been established as a subculture of an organization or enterprise.

Origin 
The origin of the Hoesik was based on the word "Hoe-min" of the Joseon Dynasty. It is said that the word "Hoe-min" was used in order to make the kings and officials of Joseon become 'Let's be one'. It seems that the most likely theory has changed from the word "Hoe-min" to "Hoesik". In this way, Hoesik is not a place for the individual, as it can be interpreted as an interpretation that the king and his subjects should live together and eat together.

History

1980s~1990s 
Under the influence of Korean traditional military cultures, those lower than the superior must drink. Binge drinking was mainly encouraged by the 'bomb shot' or 'poktanju,' including beer+spirits and soju+spirits. In the 1990s, however, the campaign for sound drinking started, and the culture to avoid social gatherings spread due to the IMF economic crisis.

2000s~the present 
Companies and organizations are trying to improve their Hoesik culture as a reaction to the prevailing social atmosphere surrounding the issues of 'bombshot', drinking glasses, and sexual harassment. Instead of focusing on just drinking and dancing, other forms of entertainment and cultural gatherings, such as watching movies and bowling are becoming increasingly common.

Changes in Hoesik with the enactment of the new law 
Kim Young-ran Act(Korean: 김영란법), also known as the anti-graft law, refers to the Improper Solicitation and Graft Act. After this law was enacted, various Hoesik practices and after work entertainment culture have significantly decreased, while the percent of individual leisure activities has increased.

Changes in Hoesik with Me Too movement 
In 2017, the Me Too movement was widespread in Korea. And the Me Too movement is changing the Hoesik inside Korean companies. The senior employees that were leading the Hoesik had fewer Hoesik as they left early. Some companies and public organizations are trying to reduce or eliminate events that their subordinates are uncomfortable with due to the Me Too movement. In other words, the Heosik that were forced on subordinates is decreasing.

Function

Positive function 
Hoesik is a place where members of an organization can relax their tension and stress, increase their closeness to each other, and resolve conflicts. Enhance understanding among team members and help them become closer to each other. By reducing stress on members and eliminating inter-person and interdepartmental conflicts, it is possible to create harmony among members and increase efficiency of production.

Adverse effect

Excessive drinking and forced drinking 
One cannot get away from alcohol at a Hoesik. Heavy drinking is a cause of embarrassment to people that are unable to drink well. This is because the boss or other office superiors are present and can witness one's drunken behavior. Because of the difficulty of refusing, people are forced to drink excessively. The next day's hangover can make them feel very tired and they can not go to work or spend the day in a bad mood.

Forced attendance at hoesik 
Many company employees are forced to attend, although their attendance is often passive and uncomfortable. Supervisors may lead the conversation while subordinates follow the conversation.

Loss of human relations with late hoesik 
Most conversations at a hoesik may be with colleagues and supervisors and focus on company's shortcomings and company gossip. Negative talk and gossip can extend outside the hoesik, leading to a breakdown of relationships and the internal atmosphere.

Lack of intent 
Most of them only have food and drink and refuse to express their inner feelings.

Conflicts with law 

Intoxication as a cause of a hoesik can lead to a loss of inhibitions and judgement. Cases of sexual harassment and drunk driving have been associated with hoesik events.

Similar traditions in Other Countries

China 
Chinese people enjoy dining at restaurants on holidays with family or friends. Such dining culture serves to exchange feelings each other and make conversation in positive ways. Most of the restaurants that Chinese people visit are popular restaurants, which are relatively cheap. Popularity of the restaurant is the first condition that identifying the restaurant. Some special restaurants are less expensive, but they are not included in the category of popular restaurants because the menu is not diverse. Popular restaurants refer to Chinese traditional dishes that are popular and common to the public, such as cold, fried, soup and stock. It is also the most common restaurant on Chinese streets. Some popular restaurants will reveal Shanghai cuisine and Guangdong cuisine on their signboards to show which food system they serve. Therefore, an area that does not identify the region's cuisine on the sign serves dishes that are to the taste of the local people.

Japan 
Half of Japanese people drink alcohol, however the rate of alcohol consumption continues to rise. Japanese men in particular have been shown to drink more often and it is common for a small number of people to drink at a pub without going home directly after work.  It is seen as polite to toast together at the beginning and drink your own choice of drink next. In Japan, Geonbae means holding glasses and drinking only the amount you want. In Japan, when a woman holds her drink well at a dinner party, it is often deemed praiseworthy. It is common for Japanese people to drink in the evening, sometimes viewed as a means to relieve stress after a day's work. In addition, Japanese people often change places where they drink and do not drink in the same places to feel different tastes at their regular dining parties.

Foods

Rainy day 
Koreans enjoy hoesik with Makgeolli (raw rice wine) and Jeon on a rainy day. There is a hypothesis that this is because the sound of the rain is similar to the sound of making the Jeon. And there is a hypothesis that on rainy days, your body's blood sugar level drops, helping to increase your blood sugar level. On rainy days, sales of flour and Makgeolli were also found to have risen sharply in large discount stores. A comparison of the rainy and sunny sales of Makgeolli and flour in Korean marts shows that sales of flour and MakgeollI rose 36.5 percent and 17.9 percent, respectively. This shows that Koreans eat a lot of Makgeolli and Jeon on rainy days.

Yellow dust day 

Koreans eat a lot of samgyeopsal during "yellow dust" storms. It was a popular food among Korean miners, who ate it after work. This is because the miners have believed that after working in much dust, samgyeopsal washed the dust with their fat. And Koreans who enjoy Hoesik usually drinks soju with samgyeopsal. Because of its good taste and cheap price. For these reasons, eating with samgyeopsal and soju is popular on yellow dust days. However, there is no scientific evidence that samgyeopsal is good for yellow dust.

Health 

Alcohol consumption is a prerequisite for a hoesik in Korea. There is no such thing as a non-drinking hoesik.

Liver 
Since most people with liver cancer drink alcohol, alcohol accounts for a significant portion of liver cancer. In Korea, almost everyone drinks alcohol unlike other countries, but in foreign countries, there is a clear distinction between those who drink and those who do not. Among American liver cancer cases, alcohol accounted for 30 to 40 percent.

Brain 
Alcohol and health, especially brain health, are closely related. Therefore, many health damage occurs and national loss occurs. Direct brain damage caused by alcohol is Alzheimer's, Bernice's syndrome, alcoholic peripheral neuropathy, alcoholic cerebellum contraction, and cerebral bridge (part of the left and right brain) contraction.

Stomach 
Alcohol is quickly absorbed from the stomach and 80 percent is absorbed before going to the intestines. High concentrations of alcohol can also damage the stomach's mucous membrane. When alcohol goes straight Stomach, it reduces the secretion of gastric juices. It can also cause interference to the mucous membrane of the stomach.

See also 
Drinking culture of Korea

References 

Korean culture
Eating parties